Hill First Baptist Church (organized in 1867) "is the oldest African American church in the Athens, Georgia community". It is a contributing property to the Reese Street Historic District.

See also
National Register of Historic Places listings in Clarke County, Georgia

References

External links

Church archive

Baptist churches in Georgia (U.S. state)
Buildings and structures in Athens, Georgia
African-American churches
Historic district contributing properties in Georgia (U.S. state)